Henry Boynton (1835–1905), was a Union Army officer.

Henry Boynton may also refer to:

 Sir Henry Boynton, son-in-law of William Cavendish (courtier)
 Reverend Henry Boynton, father of Sir Francis Boynton, 4th Baronet

See also
 Henry Boynton Smith (1815–1877), American theologian